Uri may refer to:

Places
 Canton of Uri, a canton in Switzerland
 Úri, a village and commune in Hungary
 Uri, Iran, a village in East Azerbaijan Province
 Uri, Jammu and Kashmir, a town in India
 Uri (island), an island off Malakula Island in Vanuatu, South Pacific
 Uri, Sardinia, a commune in Italy
 Uri, Darfur, capital of the Tunjur kingdom

People
 Uri (name), a given name
 Uri (Bible), two people in the Bible
 Aviva Uri (1922–1989), Israeli painter
 Eelco Uri (born 1973), Dutch water polo player
 Helene Uri (born 1964), Norwegian linguist, novelist and children's  writer
 Jaan Uri (1875–1942), Estonian politician
 Joannes Uri (1724–1796), Hungarian orientalist
 Vanessa Uri (1981–2004), Filipina actress known as Halina Perez
 Ya'akov Uri (1888–1970), Israeli politician

Abbreviations
 Ultrasound research interface, software
 Uniform Resource Identifier, a string of characters used to identify a name or a resource
 United Religions Initiative, an interfaith organization
 United Rentals's ticker symbol on the NYSE stock exchange
 Unione radiofonica italiana, first public radio broadcasting company of Italy
 University of Rhode Island
 Upper respiratory infection, short-hand for upper respiratory tract infection, including the common cold

Other
 Winter Storm Uri (February 2021), a winter storm in the United States of America that greatly affected Texas
 Uri: The Surgical Strike, a Bollywood movie of 2019 starring Vicky Kaushal
 Uri Party, a political party in South Korea
 Uri language, spoken in Papua New Guinea
 uri, ISO 639-3 code for the Urim language of Papua New Guinea
 URI Purposely Built Vehicles, a South African off-road vehicle manufacturer
 Uri, a dog in the book Call It Courage
 ʻūrī, an extinct breed of dog in Tahiti
 a variant of the game of mancala

See also

 Oriya people, an Indian gotra also called Ures
 
 Urey (disambiguation)
 Urie (disambiguation)
 Ury (disambiguation)